Hugo Gutmann, later known as Henry G. Grant (19 November 188022 June 1962), was a German Jewish army officer, notable for being one of Adolf Hitler's superior officers in World War I. During the war, he recommended Hitler for the award of the Iron Cross.

Early life and army career

Gutmann was born on 19 November 1880 in Nuremberg. In 1902, Gutmann joined the Bavarian Army and had risen to the rank of highest ranking NCO (Feldwebel) by 1904, when he was transferred to the reserves. When World War I began in 1914, Gutmann was recalled and he joined a unit known (after its first commander) as the "List" Regiment. On 15 April 1915, he was promoted to Lieutenant (Leutnant) and appointed as a company commander and acting adjutant for the Regiment's artillery battalion.

Throughout most of 1918, from 29 January to 31 August, Lt. Gutmann served as Adolf Hitler's direct superior. Gutmann later recommended Hitler's award of the Iron Cross First Class (a decoration rarely awarded to one of Hitler's Gefreiter rank). The decoration was presented to Hitler on 4 August 1918, near Soissons, by the regimental commander, Major von Tubeuf. Hitler wore this medal throughout the remainder of his career, including while serving as Führer of Nazi Germany.

Gutmann himself was an Iron Cross recipient, having been awarded the Iron Cross 2nd Class on 2 December 1914 (incidentally the same day as Hitler), as well as the Iron Cross 1st Class on 4 December 1915.

Post-World War I and Nazi years

On 8 February 1919, Gutmann was demobilized from the German Army, but was still maintained on the army rolls as a reserve lieutenant. He married later that year and went on to father two children. During the 1920s, Gutmann owned and operated an office-furniture shop in Vordere Sterngasse 3 in Nuremberg.

In the autumn of 1933, Gutmann applied for a veteran's war pension, which was granted (President Hindenburg had passed several decrees protecting Jewish war veterans from the rising tide of anti-Jewish sentiment). In 1935, after the passing of the Nuremberg Laws, Gutmann lost his German citizenship and was formally discharged from the veteran rolls of the army, but still continued to receive a pension, possibly due to Hitler's influence.

In 1938, Gutmann was arrested by the Gestapo, but released as a result of the influence of SS personnel who knew his history. In 1939, Gutmann and his family left for Belgium as World War II was beginning in Europe. In 1940, he emigrated to the United States, just prior to the German invasion of the Low Countries.

Post-World War II

Gutmann lived in St. Louis, Missouri, and worked as a typewriter salesman. He was married and had two children.

Gutmann died in San Diego, California, on 22 June 1962.  He was buried at Home of Peace Cemetery in San Diego.

Portrayal in media

In the 2003 television mini-series Hitler: The Rise of Evil, Hugo Gutmann was portrayed by actor Brendan Hughes.

Notes

References

External links

 Hugo Gutmann (Escape from Germany)

1880 births
1962 deaths
German Jewish military personnel of World War I
Jewish emigrants from Nazi Germany to the United States
Military personnel from Nuremberg
People from the Kingdom of Bavaria
Recipients of the Iron Cross (1914), 1st class
Recipients of the Iron Cross (1914), 2nd class
Bavarian emigrants to the United States